The Bermudian cricket team toured the Netherlands during the 2007 season. They played a First-class match for the 2007-08 ICC Intercontinental Cup and two One Day Internationals. The Dutch team took an innings and 44 run win over Bermuda in the First-class game and won the ODI series 2-0.

Squad lists

Intercontinental Cup match

ODI series

1st ODI

2nd ODI

References

External links
CricketArchive - Tour homepage
Cricinfo - Tour homepage

2007 in cricket
2007 in Dutch sport
Cricket in the Netherlands
2007 in Bermudian sport